Donal Roe MacCarthy Mór (died 1302) was a 13th-century noble of Ireland. He was a Prince of the Kingdom of Desmond, his father being Cormac Fionn MacCarthy, King of Desmond between 1229 and 1247.

Marriage and issue
He married Margaret Fitzmaurice, the daughter of Nicholas Fitzmaurice, Lord of Kerry and Slaine O'Brien, they had issue:
Donal Oge
Dermod Oge, killed in 1325 at Tralee, by his cousin, Maurice Fitzmaurice, Lord of Kerry.
Devorgille

1302 deaths
13th-century Irish people
MacCarthy dynasty
Year of birth unknown